The Unemployment Insurance Act 1930 was passed in the United Kingdom in response to the economic problems emerging due to the Wall Street Crash and Great Depression. It substantially reformed the benefits system and abolished the rule that those claiming benefits must genuinely be seeking work.

The changes made by the Act to the Unemployment Insurance Acts 1920 to 1929 were temporary, section 20(7) and (8) providing that they only had effect from 13 March 1930 until 30 June 1933. It was continued in force until 30 June 1934 by the Unemployment Insurance (Expiring Enactments) Act 1933.

References

Insurance legislation
United Kingdom Acts of Parliament 1930
1930s economic history
Unemployment in the United Kingdom